Cape Small is a cape in the eastern part of Casco Bay on the Maine coast. It is located in Sagadahoc County near Phippsburg.  It is generally agreed that it was named for Francis Small, who was the largest landowner in Maine's history.

References

Headlands of the United States
Casco Bay
Landforms of Sagadahoc County, Maine